Badar Khalil (born 15 October 1944), also known as 'Baddo Aapa', is a Pakistani television actress. She gained popularity for her role in the TV play Bi Jamalo portraying herself as Bi Jamalo. Later on, she appeared in many as hit TV serials on PTV from 1968 to now. She also did a TV show Mithu Aur Aapa, a critically acclaimed comedy play on Hum TV.

Early life 
Badar khalil was born in Delhi, British India to a Kashmiri father and a Delhite mother. Her family moved to Lahore during partition in 1947, but now she is living in Karachi, Pakistan. She moved with her husband Shahzad Khalil to Karachi after working for a short time at Pakistan Television Corporation (Lahore Center).

Career 
In Karachi, her first main appearance was in Unkahi which was a classic TV drama written by veteran Pakistani playwright Haseena Moin. Badar Khalil started her showbiz career in 1968 as an anchor in children's shows on PTV. Initially, Badar Khalil gained her recognition for the performance she gave in the play  Bi Jamalo, in which she played Bi Jamalo herself, directed by Shahzad Khalil whom she had married (in real life) a few years before the drama hit screens. After a short spell at PTV – Lahore TV center, Badar Khalil, with her husband, shifted to Karachi. In 1989, her husband Shahzad Khalil died of cardiac arrest. She has two children, Ibrahim and Omar. Badar Khalil has worked in many TV drama serials and she has effectively performed a variety of roles.

In July 2014, she was getting ready to move to Canada after a 46-years-long professional acting career to live with one of her sons that already lives there. Although she stayed and continued working with ARY Digital and Geo Entertainment.

Personal life 
Badar's husband was an acclaimed Pakistani TV director. The couple have two children. Badar Khalil faced a very difficult period when her husband died of a heart attack in 1989 at a young age of 45.

Filmography

Television series
 Bi Jamalo (1969) – PTV
 Half Plate – PTV
 Ankahi (1982) – PTV
 Tanhaiyaan (1985) – PTV
 Dhoop Kinare (1987) – PTV
 Parosi (1992) – NTM
 Tumse Kehna Tha (1995)
 Farar (1996)
 Peela Jora (1997)
 Pyar Agar Kabhi Phir Hua (PTV long Play) 
 Chaandni Raatain (2002) – PTV
 Quddusi Sahab Ki Bewah (2012) – ARY Digital
 Khali Haath
 Malal
 Dil Dard Dhuan
 Kuch Ankahi Batein
 Roza Kay Rozay
 Colony 52
 Aa Mere Pyar ki Khusboo
 Khandan-e-Shughliya
 Rait Hawa aur Aangan
 Haroo Tou Piya Teri
 Phir Youn Love Hua
 Bezaban
 Doraha
 Marvi
 Umrao Jan Ada
 Sheeshay ka Mahal
 Kinara Mil Gaya Hota
 Rani Beti Raaj Karey
 Chand Parosa
 Veena
 Hum Se Juda Na Hona
 Qutubuddins
 Boond Boond Tanhai
 Tum Jo Miley
 Faiz Manzil Kay Rozedar
 Perfume Chowk
 Madiha Maliha
 Meri Behan Meri Dewrani
 Shukk
 Kitni Girhain Baqi Hain
 Shareek-e-Hayat
 Malaal
 Mere Qatil Mere Dildaar
 Shikwa
 Yeh Shaadi Nahi Ho Sakti
 Vasl
 Tanhaiyan Naye Silsilay
 Mithu Aur Aapa
 Tum Milay
 Khuda Gawah
 Dil Jalta Hai

Film
 Way to Hope
 Yeh Dil Aap Ka Huwa
 Khulay Aasman Ke Neechay

Awards and recognition

References

External links
 

1947 births
Living people
Muhajir people
Pakistani television actresses
Actresses from Karachi
Hum Award winners
Actresses from Lahore
Pakistani film actresses
20th-century Pakistani actresses
PTV Award winners
21st-century Pakistani actresses
People from Lahore